Azilone-Ampaza is a commune in the Corse-du-Sud department of France on the island of Corsica.

Geography
Azilone-Ampaza is located in the Panicale Valley in the Middle Taravo region some 22 km east by south-east of Ajaccio and 4 km east of Grosseto-Prugna. The D83 road from Santa-Maria-Siché to Zévaco passes through the northern tip of the commune but has no connection to the village. Access to the village is by road D26 from Olivese in the south-east which enters the commune from the south, passing through the village, then loops south again to join the Route nationale N196 south-west of the commune. Apart from the main village there are the hamlets of Ampaza in the north-west and Azilone south of the village. The commune is rugged and heavily forested.

Neighbouring communes and villages

History
Both villages originated from the hamlet of Calcinaghju which was in the middle of the valley and destroyed by the Moors. Under the Paolinu and Genovese administrative systems, the commune belonged to the Pieve of Ornano. The town is now mainly known for being a high point on the Tour de Corse, an event that counts for the World Rally Championship (WRC).

Administration

List of Successive Mayors

Population

Culture and heritage

Religious heritage

The Chapel of Saint-Saveur d'Ampaza contains a Tabernacle (16th century) which is registered as an historical object.
The Parish Church of Sainte-Marie contains a Monstrance (19th century) which is registered as an historical object.

Azilone-Ampaza Photo Gallery

Notable people linked to the commune

Monseigneur Paul Mathieu de la Foata (1817-1899), Bishop of Ajaccio and author of Poesie giocose
Arthur Giovoni (1909-1996), resistance fighter from the beginning of the war, communist MP, Companion of the Liberation
Eliane Eva Vincileoni (1930-1989), militant libertarian, niece of Arthur Giovoni, coordinator of the anti-Franco struggle in Catalonia, founder of the group Materialismo e Libertad in Milan, Italy.

See also
Communes of the Corse-du-Sud department

References

External links

Ampaza website  
Azilone-Ampaza on Géoportail, National Geographic Institute (IGN) website 

Communes of Corse-du-Sud